Desmochitina is an extinct genus of chitinozoans. It was described by Alfred Eisenack in 1931.

Species
 Desmochitina amphorea Eisenack, 1931
 Desmochitina cocca Eisenack, 1931
 Desmochitina elongata Eisenack, 1958
 Desmochitina erinacea Eisenack, 1931
 Desmochitina grandicolla Eisenack, 1958
 Desmochitina holosphaerica Eisenack, 1968
 Desmochitina juglandiformis Laufeld, 1967
 Desmochitina minor Eisenack, 1931
 Desmochitina nodosa Eisenack, 1931
 Desmochitina ovulum Eisenack, 1962
 Desmochitina papilla Grahn, 1984
 Desmochitina piriformis Laufeld, 1967
 Desmochitina rugosa Eisenack, 1962

References

Prehistoric marine animals
Fossil taxa described in 1931